This article lists the confirmed squad lists for badminton's 2019 Sudirman Cup. The rankings below are based on 5 March 2019 as per stated in prospectus.

Group 1A

Japan
17 players are scheduled to represent Japan in the 2019 Sudirman Cup.

Thailand
16 players are scheduled to represent Thailand in the 2019 Sudirman Cup.

Russia
10 players are scheduled to represent Russia in the 2019 Sudirman Cup.

Group 1B

Indonesia
20 players are scheduled to represent Indonesia in the 2019 Sudirman Cup.

Denmark
13 players are scheduled to represent Denmark in the 2019 Sudirman Cup.

England
8 players are scheduled to represent England in the 2019 Sudirman Cup.

Group 1C

Chinese Taipei
18 players are scheduled to represent Chinese Taipei in the 2019 Sudirman Cup.

South Korea
14 players are scheduled to represent South Korea in the 2019 Sudirman Cup.

Hong Kong
16 players are scheduled to represent Hong Kong in the 2019 Sudirman Cup.

Group 1D

China
20 players are scheduled to represent China in the 2019 Sudirman Cup.

India
13 players are scheduled to represent India in the 2019 Sudirman Cup.

Malaysia
20 players are scheduled to represent Malaysia in the 2019 Sudirman Cup.

Group 2A

Netherlands
8 players are scheduled to represent Netherlands in the 2019 Sudirman Cup.

France
10 players are scheduled to represent France in the 2019 Sudirman Cup.

United States
10 players are scheduled to represent United States in the 2019 Sudirman Cup.

Vietnam
10 players are scheduled to represent Vietnam in the 2019 Sudirman Cup.

Group 2B

Germany
12 players are scheduled to represent Germany in the 2019 Sudirman Cup.

Canada
11 players are scheduled to represent Canada in the 2019 Sudirman Cup.

Singapore
11 players are scheduled to represent Singapore in the 2019 Sudirman Cup.

Israel
9 players are scheduled to represent Israel in the 2019 Sudirman Cup.

Group 3A

Ireland
5 players are scheduled to represent Ireland in the 2019 Sudirman Cup.

Australia
9 players are scheduled to represent Australia in the 2019 Sudirman Cup.

New Zealand
8 players are scheduled to represent New Zealand in the 2019 Sudirman Cup.

Nepal
4 players are scheduled to represent Nepal in the 2019 Sudirman Cup.

Group 3B

Switzerland
7 players are scheduled to represent Switzerland in the 2019 Sudirman Cup.

Sri Lanka
6 players are scheduled to represent Sri Lanka in the 2019 Sudirman Cup.

Slovakia
6 players are scheduled to represent Slovakia in the 2019 Sudirman Cup.

Lithuania
4 players are scheduled to represent Lithuania in the 2019 Sudirman Cup.

Group 4

Macau
9 players are scheduled to represent Macau in the 2019 Sudirman Cup.

Kazakhstan
11 players are scheduled to represent Kazakhstan in the 2019 Sudirman Cup.

Greenland
6 players are scheduled to represent Greenland in the 2019 Sudirman Cup.

References

External links

Group 1A
Japan team squads
Thailand team squads
Russia team squads
Group 1B
Indonesia team squads
Denmark team squads
England team squads
Group 1C
Chinese Taipei team squads
South Korea team squads
Hong Kong team squads
Group 1D
China team squads
India team squads
Malaysia team squads
Group 2A
Netherlands team squads
France team squads
United States team squads
Vietnam team squads
Group 2B
Germany team squads
Canada team squads
Singapore team squads
Israel team squads
Group 3A
Ireland team squads
Australia team squads
New Zealand team squads
Nepal team squads
Group 3B
Switzerland team squads
Sri Lanka team squads
Slovakia team squads
Lithuania team squads
Group 4
Macau team squads
Kazakhstan team squads
Greenland team squads

2019 Sudirman Cup